Al-Yaqdhah Sports Club is a Syrian professional football club based in Deir ez-Zor. It was founded in 1937. They play their home games at the Deir ez-Zor Municipal Stadium.

References

Yaqaza
Association football clubs established in 1937
Deir ez-Zor